Women Everywhere is a 1930 American Pre-Code musical adventure film directed by Alexander Korda and starring J. Harold Murray, Fifi D'Orsay, and George Grossmith, Jr. It is set amongst the French Foreign Legion in North Africa.

The film's songs include: "Women Everywhere," "Beware of Love," "One Day," "Good Time Fifi," "Bon Jour," "Marching Song" (William Kernell), "All in the Family" (Kernell, George Grossmith), and "Smile, Legionnaire" (Kernell, Charles Wakefield Cadman).

Cast
 J. Harold Murray as Charles Jackson 
 Fifi D'Orsay as Lili La Fleur 
 George Grossmith, Jr. as Aristide Brown 
 Clyde Cook as Sam Jones 
 Ralph Kellard as Michael Kopulos 
 Rose Dione as Zephyrine 
 Walter McGrail as Lieutenant of Legionnaires 
 Harry Cording as Legionnaire in Cafe
 Hans Fuerberg as German Legionnaire 
 Bob Kortman as Swedish Legionnaire 
 Louis Mercier as Waiter 
 Hector Sarno as Italian Legionnaire 
 Harry Semels as Legionnaire Officer

Bibliography
 Kulik, Karol. Alexander Korda: The Man Who Could Work Miracles. Virgin Books, 1990.

References

External links

1930 films
American musical films
American adventure films
Films directed by Alexander Korda
Fox Film films
Films about the French Foreign Legion
Films set in deserts
American black-and-white films
Films set in Morocco
1930 musical films
1930 adventure films
1930s English-language films
1930s American films